Robert Shields McSkimming (born 25 June 1956) is a Scottish retired football right back who made over 160 appearances in the Scottish League for Queen's Park. He later played in the National Soccer League for Brisbane Lions.

Honours 
Queens Park
Scottish League Second Division: 1980–81

References

Scottish footballers
Scottish Football League players
Queen's Park F.C. players
Association football fullbacks
1956 births
People from Johnstone
National Soccer League (Australia) players
Queensland Lions FC players
Scottish expatriate footballers
Scottish expatriate sportspeople in Australia
Living people
Footballers from Renfrewshire